Frank DeWar (1907-1969) was an American film editor who worked in Hollywood during the 1930s and 1940s.

Biography 
Frank was born in Seattle, Washington, to Francis DeWar Sr. (a native of Antwerp) and Mercedes Earle. The family soon relocated to Los Angeles, where Francis Sr. eventually became a prominent member of law enforcement there before dying in a 1932 plane crash.

Frank married Zelma Kennedy (niece of former Texas Gov. Ma Ferguson) in 1928; they had three children together. The pair split in 1939, and Frank was linked to actress Ann Sheridan in newspaper reports. His last known credit as a film editor was on 1942's The Right Timing.

Selected filmography 

The Right Timing (1942)
Water Sports (1941)
Big Bill Tilden (1941)
Diary of a Racing Pigeon (1940)
Famous Movie Dogs (1940)
Pony Express Days (1940)
Dogs You Seldom See (1940)
American Saddle Horses (1939)
Pride of the Blue Grass (1939)
Nancy Drew... Reporter (1939)
King of the Underworld (1939)
Penrod's Double Trouble (1938)
He Couldn't Say No (1938)
West of Shanghai (1937)
Alcatraz Island (1937)
White Bondage (1937)
Public Wedding (1937)
Under Southern Stars (1937)
Guns of the Pecos (1937)
Fugitive in the Sky (1936)
The Sunday Round-Up (1936)
Echo Mountain (1936)
The Song of a Nation (1936)
Changing of the Guard (1936)
Hollywood Newsreel (1934)

References 

American film editors
1907 births
1969 deaths
People from Seattle